St Bernard's Convent High School is a girls Catholic bilateral secondary school located in Leigh on Sea, Essex, with a mixed sixth form.

History

There has been a Catholic school on the site since 1875, however it was in 1910 that St. Bernard's Convent High School was created on the premises for young ladies by a group of Bernardine Sisters. St Bernard's school celebrated its centenary in 2010.

In 2004 St. Bernard's school achieved Specialist Arts status, and in 2008 a Specialist Science status was also achieved. The school became an academy in 2011.

Emblem
The school's emblem, which is featured on the school uniform as well as headed on letters from the school, is three swords within a double diamond. Below the diamond reads "Dieu Mon Abri" meaning "God Is My Shelter" in French.

Houses
There are currently 5 forms per year from years 7 to 11. Students in these years are placed in one of 6 different houses. These houses are: "A", "C", "F", "M" "R" and "H", which stand for Annay, Clairvaux, Fountains, Melrose, Rievaulx and Hyning, these being abbeys or monasteries which are in some way connected to Saint Bernard.

Notable former pupils
Dame Helen Mirren, actress
Anne Stallybrass, actress
Gemma Craven, actress

References

External links
St Bernard's High School and Arts College

Bilateral schools in England
Catholic secondary schools in the Diocese of Brentwood
Educational institutions established in 1910
1910 establishments in England
Secondary schools in Southend-on-Sea
Academies in Southend-on-Sea